The men's sabre was one of four fencing events on the Fencing at the 1908 Summer Olympics programme. The top two places were won by Hungarian fencers, who also took the gold medal in the team sabre event. Jenő Fuchs took the gold medal and Béla Zulawszky the silver. Bronze went to Bohemian Vilém Goppold von Lobsdorf. There were 76 competitors from 11 nations. Each nation could enter up to 12 fencers.

Background

This was the fourth appearance of the event, which is the only fencing event to have been held at every Summer Olympics. The 1900 gold medalist, Georges de la Falaise of France, returned after not competing in 1904.

Belgium, Bohemia, Great Britain, the Netherlands, and South Africa each made their debut in the men's sabre. Austria made its third appearance in the event, most of any nation, having missed only the 1904 Games in St. Louis.

Competition format

The competition was held over four rounds. In each round, each pool held a round-robin, with bouts to 3 touches. European sabre rules at the time used a target area of the whole body, in contrast to above-the-waist target area provided for by the American rules of the time, used in the 1904 Games, and which became standard after World War I. Barrages were used as necessary to determine the advancing fencers.
 First round: 13 pools of between 4 to 8 fencers each. The 3 fencers in each pool with the fewest bouts lost advanced to the second round. 
 Quarterfinals: 8 pools of 5 fencers each (except one had only 4 by design and one had only 4 due to a non-starter). The 2 fencers in each pool with the fewest bouts lost advanced to the semifinals. 
 Semifinals: 2 pools of 8 fencers each. The 4 fencers in each pool with the fewest bouts lost advanced to the final.
 Final: 1 pool of 8 fencers.

Schedule

Results

Round 1

The first round was conducted in round-robin format, to three touches. Pool sizes ranged from 4 to 8 fencers. The three contestants who had lost the fewest bouts advanced.

Pool A

Pool B

The three-way tie for the two remaining places resulted in the British fencer being eliminated.

 Barrage B

Pool C

Renaud lost both his playoff matches, eliminating him and allowing Grade and Jack to advance.

 Barrage C

Pool D

The playoff resulted in two losses for Lichtenfels.

 Barrage D

Pool E

The fifth pool was small, with only 4 fencers. This meant only one, Langevin, was eliminated.

Pool F

Petri defeated van Tomme in the playoff for third place after having lost to the Belgian in the main pool.

 Barrage F

Pool G

Badman defeated van Minden again in the playoff for third place.

 Barrage G

Pool H

Pool I

Pool J

The tenth pool was the largest, at fully twice the size of the fifth. Five of the eight fencers were eliminated. The Bohemian fencer, von Lobsdorf, defeated each of his seven opponents for a decisive first place in the pool. There was no match between Sarzano and Stohr.

Pool K

Pool L

Chapuis was eliminated in the three-way playoff for second and third.

 Barrage L

Pool M

The final pool was one of the larger pools, with 7 fencers.

Quarterfinals

There were eight second round pools, ranging in size from 4 to 5.

Quarterfinal 1

Notley's pair of victories in the playoff gave him second in the pool, allowing him to advance.

 Barrage 1

Quarterfinal 2

Quarterfinal 3

Quarterfinal 4

Quarterfinal 5

Quarterfinal 6

Quarterfinal 7

Doorman, who had lost to Petri in the main pool, defeated the German in the playoff for second place.

 Barrage 7

Quarterfinal 8

 Barrage 8

Semifinals

There were two semifinals, each of 8 fencers. The top 4 in each advanced to the final.

Semifinal 1

Semifinal 2

Four fencers tied at 5-2 records, all advancing to the finals. Ceccherini gave up after his first four bouts, giving Tóth, van der Voodt, and Doorman wins by walkover.

Final

Fuchs and de Lobsdorf did not finish within the time limit, resulting in a loss for both of them. The playoff match for the gold medal was won by Fuchs, with the one-touch bout decided by a parry and riposte to his fellow Hungarian's head.

 Barrage

Notes

Sources
 
 De Wael, Herman. Herman's Full Olympians: "Fencing 1908". Accessed 1 May 2006.

Men's sabre